Yevgeny Arsenievich Kindinov (born 24 May 1945 in Moscow) is a Russian theatre and film actor. He spent his entire professional career at the Moscow Art Theatre, and, after the theater was split in 1987, at the Chekhov Moscow Art Theatre. He is a People's Artist of Russia.

Selected filmography
 Dead Season (1968) as Soviet intelligence officer
 Punisher (1968)  as Vangelis
 A Lover's Romance (1974) as  Sergei Nikitin 
 Mama, I'm Alive (1976)  as  Viktor Glunsky 
 A Taiga Story (1979) as Goga Gertsev
 The Suicide Club, or the Adventures of a Titled Person (1981) as  Simon Rolls 
 The Blonde Around the Corner (1983) as  store clerk  (voice)
 Children of the Arbat (2004)  as  Lev Kamenev 
 Adjutants of Love (2005) as  Rene, a monk templar

References

External links

1945 births
Male actors from Moscow
Living people
Honored Artists of the RSFSR
People's Artists of the RSFSR
Recipients of the Order of Honour (Russia)
Russian male voice actors
Soviet male voice actors
Russian male film actors
Soviet male film actors
Russian male stage actors
Soviet male stage actors

Recipients of the Order "For Merit to the Fatherland", 4th class
Moscow Art Theatre School alumni